John Gray (January 6, 1764 – March 29, 1868) was the last verified veteran of the American Revolutionary War. He was confirmed a veteran of the war and awarded a pension of $500 semi-annually by House Bill 1044 (passed by Congress February 22, 1866). Journalist/attorney James M. Dalzell wrote a book (published by Gibson Brothers, Printers in 1868) titled John Gray, of Mount Vernon: the Last Soldier of the Revolution. As of the Fall of 1867 after the death of Samuel Downing in Edinburgh, Saratoga County, New York, John Gray was then believed by the Bureau of Pensions of the U.S. Department of the Interior to be the last surviving veteran.

His claim to the "last surviving veteran" of the War depends primarily on the failure of his competitors Daniel F. Bakeman and George Fruits (the former died a year later and the latter died several years after him) to prove service during the war. Samuel Downing and Gray had been granted pensions, by special act of the U.S. Congress (in February 1867, retroactive to June 1, 1866). The special act was required because the two had not previously applied for pensions or service land grants. Bakeman was unable to prove his service; Gray, while able to prove his service, had only served six months; Fruits had never had any pension.

Gray was born near the Mount Vernon plantation, home of George Washington. His father, John Gray Sr., fought in the war and was killed in the Battle of White Plains. Gray joined at age 16 in 1780, and was present at the Battle of Yorktown. After the war he moved to the Northwest Territory, and lived out most of his life in Noble County, Ohio. He had three wives during his life and fathered at least four children. He died at age 104 years, 2 months, 23 days.

A memorial to Gray is located along State Route 821 in Noble County's Noble Township.

References

 
 

1764 births
1868 deaths
American centenarians
Continental Army soldiers
Men centenarians
People from Mount Vernon, Virginia
People from Noble County, Ohio